Raya is a town and a nagar panchayat in the Mathura district of the Indian state of Uttar Pradesh. It was founded by Rai Sen, a Godar Jat. Raya formed quarter of Tappa Raya a cheifship in the pargana of Mahawan during the Mughal time. The descendants of Rai Sen remained in control of Tappa Raya till the revolt of 1857 during which there chief Raja Devi Singh Godar was hanged by the britishers.

Geography
It has an average elevation of 175 m (574 ft).

Demographics 
As of 2011 Indian Census, Raya nagar panchayat had a total population of 21,344, of which 11,202 were males and 10,142 were females. Population within the age group of 0 to 6 years was 2,990. The total number of literates in Raya was 13,551, which constituted 63.5% of the population with male literacy of 69.5% and female literacy of 56.8%. The effective literacy rate of 7+ population of Raya was 73.8%, of which male literacy rate was 80.9% and female literacy rate was 66.0%. The Scheduled Castes population was 1,624. Raya had 3325 households in 2011.

As of the 2001 Census of India, Raya had a population of 17,990. Males constitute 53% of the population and females 47%. Raya has an average literacy rate of 54%, lower than the national average of 59.5%: male literacy is 61%, and female literacy is 47%. In Raya, 17% of the population is under 6 years of age.

References

Cities and towns in Mathura district